Syria competed at the 1992 Summer Paralympics in Barcelona, Spain. 2 competitors from Syria won no medals and so did not place in the medal table.

See also 
 Syria at the Paralympics
 Syria at the 1992 Summer Olympics

References 

Syria at the Paralympics
1992 in Syrian sport
Nations at the 1992 Summer Paralympics